Roi Dagobert (FR) (foaled 16.2.1964) was a Thoroughbred racehorse (dkb/br.), by Sicambre (FR) out of Dame d'Atour (FR) (unraced).  He was a champion three-year-old in France in 1967.

Racing career
From eight starts he won four races, including the Prix Lupin (2100 m), the Prix Greffulhe (ridden by Yves Saint-Martin) (2100 m) and the Prix Noailles (then 2200 m), all at Longchamp.  He was placed three times, including second in the Critérium de Saint-Cloud at Saint-Cloud and third in the Prix Ganay at Longchamp.  His career total earnings were FF1,208,254.

Stud record
Roi Dagobert stood at stud in the US from 1969 to 1973, in France from 1974 to 1985 and in Germany from 1986 to ?.

He sired On The Sly (USA) (1973), winner of 14 races including the Lou Smith Memorial Handicap, Rosemont Stakes, Jockey Club Gold Cup (Group 1), Hawthorne Gold Cup Handicap (Group 2).-G2, Whirlaway Handicap, Donald P. Ross Handicap (Group 2) and Grey Lag Handicap (Group 2); and Abary (DE) (1980), winner of the Grosser Preis von Berlin (Group 1 - twice),  Großer Preis der Badischen Wirtschaft (Group 2 - twice)

He was broodmare sire of Made of Gold (USA)(1989), winner of the Royal Lodge Stakes (Group 2) and second in the Prix de la Salamandre (Group 1)

References

External links
 Pedigree Online database - Roi Dagobert pedigree, partial racing statistics, photograph

1964 racehorse births
Racehorses bred in France
Racehorses trained in France
Thoroughbred family 8-c